

Seeds
Champion seeds are indicated in bold text while text in italics indicates the round in which those seeds were eliminated. All four seeded teams received byes to the second round.

 Tom Gorman /  Stan Smith (semifinals)
 Tom Okker /  Marty Riessen (semifinals)
 Arthur Ashe /  Roscoe Tanner (final)
 Juan Gisbert Sr. /  Ilie Năstase (champions)

Draw

Final

Top half

Bottom half

External links
 1973 Paris Open Doubles draw

Doubles